Frédéric Thoraval (born February 18, 1973) is a French-American film editor. He was nominated for an Academy Award in the category Best Film Editing for the film Promising Young Woman.

Selected filmography 
 Promising Young Woman (2020)
 The Black Phone (2021)

References

External links 

1973 births
Living people
Place of birth missing (living people)
French emigrants to the United States
French film editors
American film editors